John Goodman is an American actor known for his roles in film, television and theatre.

Goodman gained national fame for his role as the family patriarch Dan Conner in the ABC television series Roseanne (1988–1997; 2018), for which he won a Golden Globe Award for Best Actor in 1993, and reprised the role in its sequel series The Conners. He is also known as a character actor appearing as a regular collaborator with the Coen brothers. Goodman has appeared in five of their films Raising Arizona (1987), Barton Fink (1991), The Big Lebowski (1998), O Brother, Where Art Thou? (2000), and Inside Llewyn Davis (2013).

Goodman's other film performances include lead roles in Always (1989), King Ralph (1991), The Babe (1992), The Flintstones (1994), Blues Brothers 2000 (1998), and 10 Cloverfield Lane (2016), and supporting roles in True Stories (1986), Storytelling (2001), Beyond the Sea (2004), Evan Almighty (2007), Speed Racer (2008), Pope Joan (2009), The Artist (2011), Argo (2012), The Hangover Part III (2013), The Monuments Men (2014), Trumbo (2015), Patriots Day (2016), and  Atomic Blonde (2017).

Goodman is also known for his vocal performances in various animated films. His voice roles include The Emperor's New Groove (2000), Pixar's Monsters, Inc. films (2001–2020), The Jungle Book 2 (2003), Clifford's Really Big Movie (2004), Bee Movie (2007) and The Princess and the Frog (2009).

On television, Goodman has starred in the Amazon Studios political comedy series Alpha House (2012–2013), the first season of HBO's Treme (2010–2011), the NBC sitcom Community, and the HBO comedy The Righteous Gemstones (2019–present). He is also known as a frequent host of Saturday Night Live having served as a host 13 times.

Filmography

Film

Television

Video games

Theatre

External links

References 

Male actor filmographies
American filmographies